The 2007–08 A1 Grand Prix of Nations, Czech Republic was an A1 Grand Prix race, held on October 14, 2007, at the Masaryk Circuit in Brno, Czech Republic. This was the second meeting in the 2007-08 A1 Grand Prix season.

The sprint race was won by New Zealand as was the Feature race.

Pre-race 
Swiss driver Natacha Gachnang was the first ever woman to enter in A1GP weekend, on Friday, during rookies sessions.

Qualifications

Sprint race 
The Sprint Race took place on Sunday, October 14, 2007

Main Race 
The Main Race took place also on Sunday, October 14, 2007.

Notes 
 It was the 24th race weekend (48 starts)
 It was the 2nd Czech grand prix and 2nd in Brno Circuit
 It was the first race for Adam Carroll and Michel Jourdain Jr.
 It was the first race weekend for Paolo Bossini, Adam Carroll, Natacha Gachnang, Michel Jourdain Jr., Charlie Kimball, Marchy Lee, Arie Luyendyk Jr., John Martin, Wesleigh Orr, Nicolas Prost and Robert Wickens.
 Records:
 South Africa take 6 poles position.
 A1 Team Lebanon participate on 24 races (48 starts) without won points since their first Grand Prix.
 Alex Yoong participate on 23 races (44 starts).
 Neel Jani won 169 points.

References

External links 
 Sprint Race results
 Main Race results

A1 Grand Prix Of Nations, Czech Republic, 2007-08
A1 Grand Prix
Motorsport competitions in the Czech Republic